Servite Father Lawrence Martin Jenco (27 November 1934 – 19 July 1996), a native of Joliet, Illinois, United States, was an American Catholic priest famous for being held hostage in Beirut, Lebanon by Islamic radicals. He was held captive for 564 days before being released and allowed to return to the U.S. He died in the rectory of St. Domitilla Church in Hillside, Illinois, of cancer, in 1996. He is buried in The Queen of Heaven Cemetery in Hillside, Illinois.

Kidnapping
Jenco was taken hostage in Beirut by five armed men on January 8, 1985, while serving as director of Catholic Relief Services there.

In his book Bound to Forgive, Jenco relives his kidnapping and imprisonment, and offers portraits of the Shiite Muslims who held him captive. He also discusses how his faith sustained him. He spent much of his time in prayer and meditation, making a rosary out of threads from a sack, and celebrated clandestine Masses whenever he could. At times, he was imprisoned with other hostages (see: Terry A. Anderson and Benjamin Weir) who worshipped together as "The Church of the Locked Door".

Jenco spent much of his time chained and blindfolded, and was allowed to use the toilet only once a day. He suffered serious eye infections and other health problems as a result of his captivity. In changing from one hiding place to another, he was bound with tape and placed in stifling hiding places in trucks, lest he be found by soldiers or police inspecting a vehicle. He also suffered beatings by the guards.

Release
After a period of 18 months' imprisonment, Jenco was freed on July 26, 1986, after months of negotiations involving the Reagan Administration, Shiite radicals and the Anglican envoy Terry Waite, who was himself later held hostage in Beirut for four and a half years.

After his death, federal judge Royce C. Lamberth awarded the estate and family of Jenco $314.6 million in damages from Iran for the period he was held hostage in Lebanon. The ruling includes $14.6 million in compensatory damages to Jenco and his six siblings or their estates and $300 million in punitive damages. Jenco "was treated little better than a caged animal" said Lamberth in his ruling, which laid the blame upon the Iranian government. The Iranian government defaulted on the lawsuit, declining to answer any of the allegations. Victims of foreign terrorism are allowed by law to collect court judgments from the U.S. government.

Toward the end of his captivity, Jenco was asked by one of his guards if he forgave his captors. Jenco tells in his book that at that moment he realised that he was being called to forgive, to "let go of revenge, retaliation and vindictiveness". Jenco received the Peace Abbey Courage of Conscience Award for his capacity to forgive his captors having been held hostage for 18 months and tortured by religious extremists in Beirut.

The Father Lawrence Jenco Foundation was created by fellow hostage and friend Terry Anderson after his death. It seeks to support people doing faith-based charitable work in Appalachia.

See also
List of kidnappings
List of solved missing person cases

References

External links
 Biography at Jenco Foundation website

1934 births
1980s missing person cases
1996 deaths
20th-century American Roman Catholic priests
American people taken hostage
Catholics from Illinois
Formerly missing people
Missing person cases in Lebanon
People from Joliet, Illinois